Låtefossen or Låtefoss is a waterfall located in Ullensvang Municipality in Vestland County, Norway. It is special in that it consists of two separate streams flowing down from the lake Lotevatnet, and as they fall, they join in the middle of the waterfall, just before going under the Norwegian National Road 13 built in 1867–69, making for a spectacular (and wet) view as one drives over the old, stone, six-arched bridge.

Gallery

See also
List of waterfalls#Norway

References

Ullensvang
Waterfalls of Vestland